Sohbat or Painda is a traditional food of the southern districts of Khyber Pakhtunkhwa in Pakistan. It is also called “Painda” in the Pashto language, which means “a group of people sitting together”. This dish is also popular in the Saraiki Belt of this region and is known as Damaani sohbat. Sohbat is served to honor and respect the guests that come to this area and it serves as, a symbol of unity among those who eat it. 

Pakistani cuisine
Pashtun cuisine

The dish consists of pieces of meat, usually chicken or mutton, stewed in a broth of onions, tomatoes, garlic, ginger, and other spices. The meat is then removed from the broth and deep fried separately. The broth and meat are then served on top of a torn flat bread called paasti or maaney. This bread is a local form of chapati and it is baked flat on stone slabs. It is served in a large dish called a “Thaal”, which allows for sharing and eating the dish together as a group. Sohbat is often served with fresh salads, chutneys, and tea.

This meal i.e. Sohbat/ Sareed should be fed to children to boost their immunity and help them build a good health and stay healthy.